The One America Appeal is a 501(c)(3) nonprofit organization founded on 7 September 2017, by all five then living former U.S. Presidents: Jimmy Carter, George H. W. Bush, Bill Clinton, George W. Bush, and Barack Obama. This joint appeal originally aimed to encourage support for recovery efforts for Hurricane Harvey, but was then extended to include areas most affected by Hurricanes Irma and Maria. The appeal was launched when the five former Presidents aired a joint PSA on the NFL's regular season opening broadcast.

All funds collected through this fund will go into a special account established through the George H. W. Bush Presidential Library Foundation and then all proceeds will be distributed to assist hurricane victims.

According to an update issued on 21 October 2017, the effort has raised $31 million in funds from more than 80,000 donors. The appeal concluded fundraising on 31 December 2017 and raised $41.3 million in total from around 110,500 donors.

Benefit concert
A benefit concert, "Deep from the Heart: The One America Appeal", was held on 21 October 2017 at the Reed Arena at Texas A&M University in College Station and headlined by all five living former U.S. Presidents (Barack Obama, George W. Bush, Bill Clinton, George H. W. Bush, and Jimmy Carter). Ticket sales and other proceeds went to the special hurricane recovery effort. The concert was hosted by Lee Greenwood, with Martin Guigui as Music Director, and featured the country music band Alabama, Sam Moore, Yolanda Adams, Lyle Lovett and Robert Earl Keen. Lady Gaga made a surprise appearance, performing "Million Reasons", "You and I" and "The Edge of Glory" at the concert. The Texas A&M University Singing Cadets also made an appearance to sing "The Star-Spangled Banner", "God Bless the USA" (alongside Greenwood), and "Lean on Me" at the end of the concert. A pre-taped video message from sitting US President Donald Trump was shown during the concert, in which he described the effort as "tremendous".

Donations
Donations to the fund will be distributed to these organisations:
 Houston Harvey Relief Fund
 Rebuild Texas Fund
 Florida Disaster Fund
 Juntos y unidos por Puerto Rico
 The Fund for the Virgin Islands

Founders
Five living former U.S. Presidents were co-founders of the One America Appeal in 2017. (George H.W. Bush died on 30 November 2018.)

References

External links
 
 YouTube channel

Jimmy Carter
George H. W. Bush
Bill Clinton
George W. Bush
Barack Obama
Hurricane Harvey
Hurricane Irma
Charities based in Texas
Non-profit organizations based in Texas
Organizations established in 2017
2017 establishments in Texas
Benefit concerts in the United States